Ten-17 was an Independent Local Radio station, broadcast from studios at the Latton Bush Centre in Harlow. The station launched in May 1993 and served Harlow, East Herts and West Essex until its closure on 25 July 2010.

History
Ten 17 came into existence following long campaigning work by voluntary group Harlow Community Radio Association (HCRA), which had the goal of launching a community radio station for the Harlow area. HCRA was led by four former Harlow Hospital radio officers: Russ Lewell (Chairman), Alan Hall (Secretary), Tony Saxby (Treasurer) and Tony Poole (Station Manager), who formed Harlow FM Ltd as the legal entity for the group. HCRA and Harlow FM Ltd had well over 100 volunteers interested in radio or with community orientation and supportive of a radio station specifically for Harlow. Due to the success of the group, which gained widespread support from the local community, the Radio Authority (the regulator at the time) was sufficiently impressed by the Group's work and offer that they decided to advertise Harlow as one of the first licences for its new small scale commercial radio licences  Upon the announcement of issue of the operating licence, Harlow FM Ltd was the only applicant group and it was widely assumed that they would be successful in being granted the licence.

However, the Radio Authority suspended the licence grant having reservations about the financial backing of the community group. HCRA therefore entered discussions with Essex Radio Group to agree terms to jointly run the radio station. Essex Radio Group chairman Eric Moonman and Managing Director Phil Hinton took a personal interest in the cooperation, and a Station Director from Essex Radio, Peter Kerridge, was appointed to lead the development and launch what then became ten 17 FM.  Russ Lewell and Alan Hall from the original HCRA group became directors of the re-formed Harlow FM Ltd, along with Eric Moonman, Phil Hinton and Mick Garrett (Essex Radio Finance Director).  Although Essex Radio was the major shareholder, members of the HCRA were also given the opportunity to purchase shares, which many did.

Ten 17 launched on 1 May 1993. The first presenters were taken from the group of HCRA volunteers and trained by the Essex Radio Team. Russ Lewell was the first presenter to speak on Ten 17, and other voluntary presenters at time of launch included Tony Saxby, Ian Daborn, Graham Hindley, Vicky James, Steve Sampson and Steve Saunders. 

The technical team was headed locally Zulqar Cheema.

Many volunteers who presented programmes on Ten 17 have gone on to have successful careers in broadcasting and the media, including Simon Burrell (Simon James) and James Burrell ("Hill"), Scott Hughes, Chris Badcock, Gavin Inskip, David Francis, Debbie Mackintosh (Mac), Dave Wartnaby (Kelly) and Gary Mulligan.

Peter Kerridge, the first Station Director, is now Chief Executive of Christian radio station Premier.  On Peter's departure from Ten 17, Russ Lewell, one of the original founders and presenter became Station Director.

1993 to 1999 - The Essex Radio Group
The local station for the Essex new town of Harlow was launched back in May 1993 by the Essex Radio Group, and was closely linked to sister station Essex FM in Southend-on-Sea. Essex FM made use of the 101.7 FM transmitter to rebroadcast its output, leaving Ten 17 to broadcast a mere three-hour evening show from local studios in Harlow.

As time moved on, the station took on more hours, more staff, better studio equipment, and computerisation. Eventually, Ten 17 became a completely local station for Harlow.

1999 - DMG Radio ltd

In 1999 Ten 17 FM was rebranded as Mercury FM, as were 5 of the 6 stations owned by DMG Radio Ltd. This station was known as Mercury 101.7. It was then changed back to Ten-17 when it was bought by GWR.

The 2000s onwards - GWR, GCap, and Global
Ten-17's owners, GWR, later merged with Capital Radio to become G-Cap. The station was retained. G-Cap was then bought by Global Radio in 2008. Up until July 2010, the station formed part of Global's The Hit Music Network, broadcasting a mix of locally produced output from Harlow and networked programming from Nottingham.

Closure
On 21 June 2010, Global Radio announced plans to rebrand Ten 17 as Heart and merge the station with Heart Essex and Heart Colchester as part of restructuring plans for the Heart Network.

The new station, Heart Essex, launched on Monday 26 July 2010 and broadcasts from studios in Chelmsford. The very last programme from Ten 17 was broadcast on Sunday 25 July 2010.

References

External links 
 Ten-17 FM website

The Hit Music Network
Harlow
Radio stations established in 1993
Radio stations in Essex
Radio stations in Hertfordshire
1993 establishments in England